The Mel Greenberg Media Award, named after Women's Basketball Hall of Fame Legend Mel Greenberg, is presented annually by the Women's Basketball Coaches Association (WBCA) to "a member of the media who has best displayed a commitment to women’s basketball and to advancing the role of the media in the women’s game".

Selection process
The inaugural award was given to Mel Greenberg in 1991 by the WBCA. Thereafter, future winners have been selected by the past recipients. Candidates for consideration must "have had a positive impact on the growth and national or regional exposure of the sport, been involved in the media exposure of women’s basketball for a minimum of five years and should be a media ambassador for the women’s game."

Presentation
The award is presented annually at the WBCA Award ceremony, held during the annual WBCA Convention, which is held each year in conjunction with the NCAA Women's Final Four.

Award winners

 1991—Mel Greenberg, Philadelphia Inquirer
 1992—Debbie Becker, USA  TODAY
 1993—Jane Burns, Des Moines Register
 1994—Mimi Griffin, MSG Promotions/ESPN
 1995—Mike Augustin, St. Paul  Pioneer Press
 1996—Debby Jennings, University of  Tennessee
 1997—Mitch Parkinson,  Southern Illinois University
 1998—Mary Garber, Winston-Salem Journal
 1999—Ann Meyers Drysdale, ESPN
 2000—Vic Dorr, Richmond  Times-Dispatch   
 2001—Robin Roberts, ABC News  
 2002—Bob Kenney, Courier  Post   
 2003—Mechelle Voepel, Kansas City Star/ESPN   
 2004—Tam Flarup, University of  Wisconsin–Madison    
 2005—Dave Loane,  University of Illinois  
 2006—Bill Jauss, Chicago Tribune  
 2007—Debbie Antonelli, CSTV  
 2008—Dan Fleser, Knoxville News-Sentinel  
 2009—Chuck Schoffner, Associated  Press
 2010—Dick Patrick, USA Today
 2011—Carol Stiff, ESPN
 2012—Mike Carmin, Lafayette Journal & Courier
 2013—Vicki Friedman, Freelance Writer
 2014—Mary Jo Haverbeck (deceased), Penn State SID 
 2015—Graham Hays ESPN
 2016—Brenda VanLengen
 2017—Ken Neal, Fox Sports
 2018—Doug Feinberg, The Associated Press
 2019—Michelle Smith-McDonald
 2020—Maria M. Cornelius
 2021—LaChina Robinson, ESPN
 2022—Holly Rowe, ESPN and Charles Hallman, Minnesota Spokesman-Recorder

See also
 Mel Greenberg

References 

Awards established in 1991
College basketball trophies and awards in the United States
1991 establishments in the United States